The 2010 Côte d'Ivoire Premier Division season was the 50th edition and current of the top-tier competition of Côte d'Ivoire football. The season began on 17 January 2010 and concluded on 5 November 2010. ASEC Mimosas successfully defended their title and captured their 2nd consecutive championship.

Team movement

Relegated from 2009 Côte d'Ivoire Premier Division
Ecole de Football Yéo Martial
Entente Sportive de Bingerville

Promoted to 2010 Côte d'Ivoire Premier Division
FC Hiré
Academie de Football Amadou Diallo

Teams

Table

External links
 rsssf
 Soccerway.com

Ligue 1 (Ivory Coast) seasons
1
Ivory
Ivory